The New Vietnam Revolutionary Party or Revolutionary Party of the New Vietnam 1925-1930, was a non-communist revolutionary party in Vietnam's early independence movement founded by Nguyễn Thị Minh Khai.

History
During the 1920s openly democratic patriotic movement in the French Indochina, on July 14, 1925, a number of students from Indochina Pedagogical College and a number of former political prisoners in Annam established Hội Phục Việt (Vietnamese Restoration Association).

After being exposed after spreading leaflets asking the French authorities to release patriot Phan Bội Châu (November 1925). Hội Phục Việt changed its name several times and eventually changed to Tân Việt Revolutionary Party (July 1928).

Tân Việt Revolutionary Party gathered young intellectuals and patriotic petty bourgeois youth, operating mainly in Annam. Born and operating while the Vietnamese Revolutionary Youth League was thriving, the theories of Marxism–Leninism had a great influence, Tân Việt Revolutionary Party attracted a lot of patriotic young people to participate.

During its operation, the party split into two left-wing and right-wing tendencies. In the end, the leftist tendency to embrace communism prevailed. Some members were transferred to study at the Revolutionary Youth League (founded in November 1925, led by Hồ Chí Minh), actively preparing for the establishment of a new party following the path of the Communist Party of Vietnam.

In 1929 it became communist and reformed as the Indochinese Communist League (Đông Dương Cộng sản Liên đoàn) which was one of the three communist groups of 1929-1930 which formed the base of the Vietnamese Communist Party.

See also
 Vietnamese Revolutionary Youth League
 Indochinese Communist League

References

 
 
 
 
 
 
 
 
 
 
 
 
 
 
 
 
 
 
 
 
 
 
 

Communist parties in Vietnam
Defunct political parties in Vietnam
History of the Communist Party of Vietnam
Political parties established in 1929
Political parties disestablished in 1930
1929 establishments in French Indochina
1930 disestablishments in French Indochina
1929 establishments in Vietnam
1930 disestablishments in Vietnam
1920s in French Indochina